Qala-i-Jangi is a 19th-century fortress located near Mazar-i-Sharif in northern Afghanistan. It is known for being the site of a bloody 2001 Taliban uprising named the Battle of Qala-i-Jangi, in which at least 470 people were killed, including CIA agent Johnny "Mike" Spann. It served as Northern Alliance General Abdul Rashid Dostum's military garrison during the opening stages of the War in Afghanistan (2001–2021).

History
The fort was built in 1889 by Abdur Rahman, the 19th-century “Iron Amir,” the first ruler to unite Afghanistan. Then known as Dehdadi after the village nearby, it was built with British funds and intended both to defend against Russian invasion and to suppress revolts by Uzbek tribes. Rahman described it as "the largest and strongest fort that had ever been built in Afghanistan." It took 18,000 workers 12 years to complete it. In 1929, about 300 Russian troops were besieged inside the fort by 20,000 Turkmens. The name Qala-i-Jangi was probably not given to the fort until the 1940s. The Russians, with Dostum’s support, occupied it again after their 1979 invasion. Mujahideen attacked Qala-i Jangi in 1981, removing 170 pro-Soviet Afghan soldiers. The Taliban occupied the fort for most of the time from 1994 to 2001. Abdul Rashid Dostum, of the Northern Alliance held the fort briefly in 1997, with 20,000 militia.

Description
It was constructed out of wooden beams, mud and straw. Rainfall of  annually enabled the structure to avoid liquification. It was a walled city, divided evenly into northern and southern courtyards by an  wall. It contained a gold-domed mosque, a  square "Pink House," erected in the 1980s by the occupying Soviet Union, as a medical facility. On November 26, 2001, the north-eastern tower was destroyed by an errant American JDAM missile.

See also 
 List of prisons in Afghanistan

References 

Archaeological sites in Afghanistan
Forts in Afghanistan
Buildings and structures in Balkh Province
History of Balkh Province